Choa Chu Kang, alternatively spelt as Chua Chu Kang and often abbreviated as CCK, is a planning area and residential town located at the north-westernmost point of the West Region of Singapore. The town shares borders with Sungei Kadut to the north, Tengah to the southwest, Bukit Batok to the southeast, Bukit Panjang to the east and the Western Water Catchment to the west. Choa Chu Kang New Town is separated into two portions by the Kranji Expressway.

Originally a kampung, the area has been rapidly developed under the ambition of the Housing and Development Board, to transform it into a modern township. The town comprises seven subzones, five of which are the most densely populated: Choa Chu Kang Central, Choa Chu Kang North, Yew Tee, Teck Whye, and Keat Hong.

Etymology
Choa Chu Kang's name is derived from its historical core at the former site of Chua Chu Kang Village located near the junction of Choa Chu Kang Road and Jalan Sungei Poyan, currently occupied by the grounds of the National Shooting Centre which comes under the purview of Singapore Shooting Association. The name began to be applied to the general area around the village when Choa Chu Kang Road, a main arterial road linking the village to Upper Bukit Timah Road towards the east was built.

The name "Choa Chu Kang" is derived from the Teochew word "kang chu". In the nineteenth century, Chinese immigrants to plant gambier and pepper along the river banks of Choa Chu Kang, although many migrated to Johor to the north at the encouragement of the Temenggong of Johor. The plantation owners were known as Kangchu - the word "kang" refers to the riverbank and "chu" means "owner" or "master", referring to the headman in charge of the plantations in the area. "Choa" is the clan name of the first headman.

History

Early history
Choa Chu Kang was a diverse area with old kampong housing and rubber plantations. Residents had to depend on boats or bullock carts for transportation. Among the few villages which sprang up were Kampong Belimbing and Chua Chu Kang Village. Most of the inhabitants belonged to the Teochew dialect group. The early Teochew settlers were mainly farmers growing gambier and pepper. The Hokkiens, who moved in later, established pineapple, rubber and coconut plantations as well as vegetable farms and poultry farms. In the early days, tigers used to roam in the area. The last tiger of Singapore was shot here in the 1930s.

Kampong Belimbing, Chua Chu Kang Village and Kampong Berih was demolished in phases from 1993 to 1998. It was replaced by National Shooting Centre and military plot (Cemetery North) and (Jalan Bahar). The Cemetery North is gazetted as an army restricted and live-firing area from 19 September 2003. The Jalan Bahar is gazetted as an army restricted and live-firing area from 16 March 2001.

The name Choa Chu Kang is used for Choa Chu Kang Road and its nearby facilities. However, the original name Chua Chu Kang is retained in the cemetery area.

New town era (1980s)
The new town era had been evolved since 1985 where Teck Whye was developed (the first HDB blocks since 1977), and it was extended to N2, N3 and N4 by 1992 with the cutting short of Choa Chu Kang Road. Yew Tee was developed by 1997, with N5, N6 and N7 being completed and residents had moved in.

There is still a military training area at Yew Tee/Kranji Camp premises, which is since 6 February 2002. The camps are Kranji and Mowbray Camps.

Choa Chu Kang also had their new neighbourhood being completed, the Neighbourhood 8 by 2015. On 25 April 2015, bus services such as 300, 301 and 983 were being enhanced for their needs of residents. Bus service 301 and 983 took over the deleted portions of service 300. On 27 December 2015, service 983 was also extended via Choa Chu Kang Avenue 1, Choa Chu Kang Avenue 7, Choa Chu Kang Grove, Choa Chu Kang Way, Choa Chu Kang Road, Upper Bukit Timah Road, Petir Road, Jelebu Road all the way to Bukit Panjang to enhance connectivity to the Downtown MRT Line.

Politics
When Choa Chu Kang Town was built by expanding Teck Whye Estate near the other end of Choa Chu Kang Road at its junction with Upper Bukit Timah Road and Woodlands Road to the north, the place name began to be applied to a much larger area, especially when political divisions like the Choa Chu Kang ward applied to the entire northwest sector of the country during some editions of the Parliamentary elections. Likewise, the residents' committees in Choa Chu Kang were expanded in 1988 and 1991, and part of Chua Chu Kang sector had given way to Yew Tee division, followed by Keat Hong division in 2001. The growing demand of Keat Hong Neighbourhood 8 also requested for redrawing of boundaries whereby Limbang ward took over the parts of Yew Tee and Choa Chu Kang, giving a nice feel of Neighbourhood 5 and 6. Today, the Yew Tee and Limbang wards fall within the Marsiling-Yew Tee Group Representation Constituency and the rest of the town such as Keat Hong and Chua Chu Kang fall within the Chua Chu Kang Group Representation Constituency.

In 2020, with the further growth of Keat Hong Neighbourhood 8 and Tengah New Town, Brickland ward was introduced, taking over parts of Keat Hong, Bukit Gombak, Chua Chu Kang and Nanyang.

Education
Choa Chu Kang area has a total of eight primary schools, six secondary schools, two post-secondary institutions and a single special needs school as of 2022.

Primary schools 

 Choa Chu Kang Primary School
 Concord Primary School
 De La Salle School
 Kranji Primary School
 South View Primary School
 Teck Whye Primary School
 Unity Primary School
 Yew Tee Primary School

Secondary schools 

 Bukit Panjang Government High School
 Choa Chu Kang Secondary School
 Kranji Secondary School
 Regent Secondary School
 Unity Secondary School

Tertiary Institutions 

 ITE College West
 Jurong Pioneer Junior College

Other schools 

 APSN Delta Senior School

Transportation facilities
City planners plan for public transport to eventually become the preferred mode of transport in the future. The government of Singapore ideally desires environmental towns, using public transport to reduce pollution caused by heavy road traffic. Choa Chu Kang is part of the Urban Redevelopment Authority's focus for realising this urban planning model and is still undergoing an expansion of its town. As Choa Chu Kang is relatively distant from the city centre at the Central Area, an efficient, high-volume and high-speed public transport system is also preferred to using road networks.

Choa Chu Kang MRT/LRT station and Choa Chu Kang Bus Interchange are conveniently connected to each another in the town centre to allow seamless travel for the residents of Choa Chu Kang New Town across the different available modes of public transport.

Public transport

Rail

Choa Chu Kang New Town is linked to the Central Area and to the other lines on the MRT/LRT system (to the East-West line at Jurong East station, to the Thomson-East Coast line at Woodlands station, to the Circle line at Bishan station, to the Downtown line at Newton station and the North East line at Dhoby Ghaut station) through the North South line (NSL) at Choa Chu Kang station (NS4) located at Choa Chu Kang Town Centre. It usually takes an hour for passengers to travel from Choa Chu Kang to the Central Area which changes at Jurong East.

The intra-town Bukit Panjang LRT is a 7.8 km light rail line that serves to link residents to the town centre and the nearby town of Bukit Panjang, hence the line's name. It is a fully driverless system.

Yew Tee station (NS5), the other station along NSL in Choa Chu Kang New Town, serves the housing developments in Yew Tee, the industrial estate of Sungei Kadut, and the northern part of Choa Chu Kang New Town. The station started operations on 10 February 1996. Like Choa Chu Kang, it usually takes an hour for passengers to travel from Yew Tee to the Central Area when using the station which changes at Jurong East.

Bus services

Bus services are available at the Choa Chu Kang Bus Interchange which is connected to the Choa Chu Kang MRT/LRT station and the town's central shopping mall Lot One Shoppers' Mall. It was opened in 1990 with 12 bus services under SBS Transit and at their own Choa Chu Kang Bus Package, all handed over to SMRT Buses in 1999. On 16 December 2018, the interchange was relocated to a new facility at the junction of Choa Chu Kang Way and Choa Chu Kang Loop, with the old interchange being demolished due to the construction of the Jurong Region Line. All services were amended to the new interchange on that day.

The bus interchange currently has 15 services; 14 are public bus services (mostly operated by SMRT Buses, the other a special free shuttle to Qian Hu Fish Farm. Typically passenger traffic is often very high in morning and evening peak hours.

Bus services were introduced over the years in Choa Chu Kang:
25 April 2015: Service 983 was introduced from Choa Chu Kang to Keat Hong Close, and extended on 27 December 2015 to Bukit Panjang.
27 December 2015: Service 979 was introduced from Bukit Panjang to Yew Tee.
15 May 2016: Service 308 was introduced from Choa Chu Kang to Keat Hong Link (Loop).
8 April 2018: Service 974 was introduced from Bukit Panjang Temporary Bus Park to Joo Koon.
30 September 2018: Service 991 was even extended from Bukit Batok West, via Bukit Gombak MRT, Bukit Batok West Avenue 5, Brickland Road, Choa Chu Kang Avenues 3 and 1, and Keat Hong Link to Choa Chu Kang, replacing route 308.
10 November 2019: Service 976 was introduced from Choa Chu Kang to Bukit Panjang.

In addition, 300 and 302 were the last bus routes to be converted to use double deckers after the articulated buses starts retiring in 2017.

Road network

The Kranji Expressway (KJE) links Choa Chu Kang Town up with Singapore's expressway network. With the KJE, drivers can change onto the Bukit Timah Expressway (BKE) which in turn, is connected to the Pan-Island Expressway (PIE) which travels to the Central Area and the eastern parts of Singapore. As the town is surrounded by the towns of Bukit Panjang, Bukit Batok, Bukit Gombak and southern Woodlands, many roads (old and new) have been constructed to link Choa Chu Kang into other towns which eventually allows residents to other parts of the country by either bus, train, car or any other reliable means of transportation.

The following roads connect the central town of Choa Chu Kang to the nearby towns of Bukit Batok and Bukit Panjang:
 Bukit Batok Road (links Choa Chu Kang with Bukit Batok and Jurong East)
 Choa Chu Kang Road
 Upper Bukit Timah Road (northern section connects with Choa Chu Kang Road)
 Teck Whye Lane
 Bukit Panjang Road
 Brickland Road
 Woodlands Road

The following roads connect the central town of Choa Chu Kang to its northern counterpart neighbourhood, Yew Tee:
 Choa Chu Kang Way
 Choa Chu Kang Drive (parallel to the track between Choa Chu Kang and Yew Tee MRT stations)

Amenities

Commercial

There are two main shopping centres in Choa Chu Kang. Lot One is the main shopping mall by CapitaLand and it is a major hub in Choa Chu Kang,. Its anchor tenants are NTUC FairPrice, Shaw Theatres, BHG, Cotton On and Choa Chu Kang Community Library. The other two shopping malls in Choa Chu Kang are Yew Tee Square and Yew Tee Point which was located in Yew Tee, owned by Frasers Centrepoint. The mall has undergone enhancement works to create a four-storey retail extension block measuring over 16,500 sq ft (1,530 m2). The works, which commenced in July 2007, was completed by end-2008.

For Junction 10, it is a shopping mall by Far East Organisation, which is located at Ten Mile Junction. There is Giant Hypermarket nearby as an anchor tenant.

The other shopping malls are neighbourhood malls. They are Choa Chu Kang Centre, Keat Hong Shopping Centre, Limbang Shopping Centre, Sunshine Place and Teck Whye Shopping Centre. They are smaller scale.

Medical
The estate also contains a polyclinic renovated in 2010. It is operated by the National University Polyclinics. There is also a newly setup Keat Hong Family Medicine Clinic (FMC) which is a collaboration between National University Hospital (NUH) and Trilink Healthcare Pte Ltd in the new Keat Hong Community Club building.

Parks, recreational and sport venues
Choa Chu Kang Park – a major park of the town located in the northern part of Choa Chu Kang
Choa Chu Kang Stadium – the town's major stadium which was a practice venue for the 2010 Youth Olympic Games
Choa Chu Kang Swimming Complex – located adjacent to Choa Chu Kang stadium located in Yew Tee
Tembusu Park
Limbang Park
Choa Chu Kang Mega Playground
Stagmont Park
Yew Tee Park

Military Camps
Stagmont Camp
Kranji Camp I,II, III 
Mowbray Camp
Police K-9 Unit
SAF Detention Barracks

References

 
Places in Singapore
West Region, Singapore
New towns in Singapore
Hokkien place names
New towns started in the 1980s